A Golden Anniversary Bibliography of Edgar Rice Burroughs is a bibliography of the works of Edgar Rice Burroughs by Henry Hardy Heins.  It was first published by Donald M. Grant, Publisher, Inc. in an edition of 1,000 copies.  The book was revised from a mimeograph edition that Heins had produced in September 1962.  The book lists books, stories, and articles by Burroughs.  It also contains information about Burroughs and a section on magazine illustrations and publisher's announcements.

References

1964 non-fiction books
American non-fiction books
Burroughs
Books about books
Science fiction studies
Published bibliographies
Edgar Rice Burroughs
Donald M. Grant, Publisher books